L-Zone is a 1992 video game published by Synergy Inc.

Gameplay
L-Zone is a game in which the player explores the setting in the far future, in a valley by the deserted Dome City of No Name.

Reception
Tony Reveaux reviewed the game for Computer Gaming World, and stated that "L-Zone is the embodiment of technological adventure in the future tense."

Reviews
Coming Soon Magazine - Feb, 1995
PC Joker - Feb, 1995
Power Play - Apr, 1994
High Score - Aug, 1995

References

1992 video games
Adventure games
Classic Mac OS games
NEC PC-9801 games
ScummVM-supported games
Video games developed in Japan
Windows games